Melittia lentistriata is a moth of the family Sesiidae. It is known from Malawi, Kenya and Zimbabwe.

References

Sesiidae
Moths of Africa
Moths described in 1919